Don't Lose Heart, Suzanne! is a 1935 German drama film directed by Arzén von Cserépy, and starring Jessie Vihrog, Veit Harlan, and Willi Schur.

Plot
The film takes place in the film milieu towards the end of the Weimar Republic against the background of the world economic crisis. The title character Susanne is an unemployed extra who, through an assistant director, finds a supporting role in the kitsch film Love Me in Honolulu. The producers are Jews who are portrayed as greedy and lustful and at the same time run an illegal casino. When a visitor commits suicide, the film producers kidnap Susanne and another actress as a distraction. Georg, Susanne's fiancé frees the women. Together, they try to prove the guilt of the producers. As a result of in just don't soften, Susanne! When the National Socialists seize power, the producers are arrested and Susanne and Georg become a married couple.

Background
The film's sets were designed by the art directors Erich Grave and Karl Vollbrecht. The film offered support to the Nazi Party's anti-Semitic stance by a negative portrayal of the two Jewish film producers. It received strong official backing, and a gala premiere was arranged for its release by Joseph Goebbels. To Goebbels' surprise and disgust, the first night audience booed, once the screening was over. The incident was largely hushed-up, and the film's director Arzén von Cserépy went back to his native Hungary in disgrace and never made another German film.

The film was a success, however, for the young actress Hilde Krüger. Following this film, she was given the patronage of Goebbels. She was to appear in twenty more films, and went on to be a spy for Germany.

Cast

References

External links

1935 drama films
German drama films
Films of Nazi Germany
Films directed by Arzén von Cserépy
Films about filmmaking
Nazi propaganda films
German black-and-white films
1930s German films
1930s German-language films